The 2022–23 season is the 77th season in the existence of HNK Rijeka and the club's 32nd consecutive season in the top flight of Croatian football. In addition to the domestic league, Rijeka participated in this season's editions of the Croatian Cup and the UEFA Europa Conference League.

Competitions

Overall

SuperSport HNL

League table

Results summary

Results by round

Results by opponent

Source: 2022–23 Croatian Football League article

Matches

SuperSport HNL

Croatian Cup

UEFA Europa Conference League

Friendlies

Pre-season

On-season (2022)

Mid-season

On-season (2023)

Player seasonal records
Updated 20 March 2023. Competitive matches only.

Goals

Source: Competitive matches

Clean sheets

Source: Competitive matches

Disciplinary record

Source: nk-rijeka.hr

Appearances and goals

Source: nk-rijeka.hr

Suspensions

Penalties

Transfers

In

Source: Glasilo Hrvatskog nogometnog saveza

Out

Source: Glasilo Hrvatskog nogometnog saveza

Spending:  €750,000
Income:  €2,500,000
Expenditure:  €1,750,000

Notes

References

HNK Rijeka seasons
Croatian football clubs 2022–23 season
2022–23 UEFA Europa Conference League participants seasons